Nobres is a city in the state of Mato Grosso, Brazil. It is located approximately 140 kilometers from Cuiabá on the south slopes of the Serra Azul.

Tourists are encouraged to visit the region for its beautiful waterways and limestone caves. 
The municipality contains the  Gruta da Lagoa Azul State Park (Cave of the Blue Lagoon State Park), created in 1999.
The rock deposits in the area have also been used to study post-glacial carbonates.
The municipality contains most of the  Águas do Cuiabá Ecological Station, a fully protected conservation unit in the cerrado biome.

Population: 14.938 

The local currency is the Real.

The two major religious faiths are Roman Catholic and Protestant.

References

Municipalities in Mato Grosso